Methyl isocyanate (MIC) is an organic compound with the molecular formula CH3NCO. Synonyms are isocyanatomethane and methyl carbylamine. Methyl isocyanate is an intermediate chemical in the production of carbamate pesticides (such as carbaryl, carbofuran, methomyl, and aldicarb). It has also been used in the production of rubbers and adhesives. As an extremely toxic and irritating compound, it is very hazardous to human health. It was the principal toxicant involved in the infamous Bhopal gas disaster, which officially killed around 20,000 people in total. It is also a very potent lachrymatory agent

Physical properties 

Methyl isocyanate is a colorless, poisonous, lachrymatory (tearing agent), flammable liquid. It is soluble in water to 6–10 parts per 100 parts, but it also reacts with water (see Reactions below).

Manufacture 

Methyl isocyanate is usually manufactured by the reaction of monomethylamine and phosgene. For large scale production, it is advantageous to combine these reactants at higher temperature in the gas phase. A mixture of methyl isocyanate and two moles of hydrogen chloride is formed, but N-methylcarbamoyl chloride (MCC) forms as the mixture is condensed, leaving one mole of hydrogen chloride as a gas.

The methyl isocyanate is obtained by treating the MCC with a tertiary amine, such as N,N-dimethylaniline, or with pyridine or by separating it by using distillation techniques.

Methyl isocyanate is also manufactured from N-methylformamide and air. In the latter process, it is immediately consumed in a closed-loop process to make methomyl. Other manufacturing methods have been reported.

Reactions 

Methyl isocyanate reacts readily with many substances that contain N-H or O-H groups. With water, it forms 1,3-dimethylurea and carbon dioxide with the evolution of heat (1358.5 joules, or 325 calories, per gram of MIC):

At 25 °C, in excess water, half of the MIC is consumed in 9 min.; if the heat is not efficiently removed from the reacting mixture, the rate of the reaction will increase and rapidly cause the MIC to boil. Such a reaction triggered the Bhopal disaster after that water was accidentally introduced in a MIC storage tank during cleaning operation of an adjacent pipe without closing the proper isolation valve of the reservoir. The consequence of the out of control exothermic process was a runaway reaction and the direct release of 42 tons of MIC to the atmosphere. 

If MIC is in excess, 1,3,5-trimethylbiuret is formed along with carbon dioxide. Alcohols and phenols, which contain an O-H group, react slowly with MIC, but the reaction can be catalyzed by trialkylamines or dialkyltin dicarboxylate. Oximes, hydroxylamines, and enols also react with MIC to form methylcarbamates. These reactions produce the products described below (Uses).

Ammonia, primary, and secondary amines rapidly react with MIC to form substituted ureas. Other N-H compounds, such as amides and ureas, react much more slowly with MIC.

It also reacts with itself to form a trimer or higher molecular weight polymers. In the presence of catalysts, MIC reacts with itself to form a solid trimer, trimethyl isocyanurate, or a higher molecular weight polymer:

Sodium methoxide, triethyl phosphine, ferric chloride and certain other metal compounds catalyze the formation of the MIC-trimer, while the high-molecular-weight polymer formation is catalyzed by certain trialkylamines. Since the formation of the MIC trimer is exothermic (1246 joules, or 298 calories, per gram of MIC), the reaction can lead to violent boiling of the MIC. The high-molecular-weight polymer hydrolyzes in hot water to form the trimethyl isocyanurate. Since catalytic metal salts can be formed from impurities in commercial grade MIC and steel, this product must not be stored in steel drums or tanks.

Toxicity 

Methyl isocyanate is extremely toxic. There is no known antidote. The threshold limit value set by the American Conference of Governmental Industrial Hygienists is 0.02 ppm. MIC is toxic by inhalation, ingestion and contact in quantities as low as 0.4 ppm. Exposure symptoms include coughing, chest pain, dyspnea, asthma, irritation of the eyes, nose and throat, as well as skin damage. Higher levels of exposure, over 21 ppm, can result in pulmonary or lung edema, emphysema and hemorrhages, bronchial pneumonia and death. Although the odor of methyl isocyanate cannot be detected at 5 ppm by most people, its potent lachrymal properties provide an excellent warning of its presence (at a concentration of 2–4 parts per million (ppm) subject's eyes are irritated, while at 21 ppm, subjects could not tolerate the presence of methyl isocyanate in air).

Proper care must be taken to store methyl isocyanate because of its ease of exothermically polymerizing (see Reactions) and its similar sensitivity to water.

During structural fires, natural materials can contribute to releasing isocyanates including methyl isocyanate.

Mechanism of action 
Until recent decades, the mechanism of methyl isocyanate toxicity in humans was largely unknown or unclear. Methyl isocyanate and other isocyanates are electrophiles and are currently thought to cause toxicity by the alkylation of biomolecules. The mechanism of methyl isocyanate was previously suspected to be the carbamylation of hemoglobin which would interfere with its oxygen binding capability causing hypoxia. However, experiments showed that when rats and guinea pigs were exposed to methyl isocyanate at concentrations above the median lethal concentration (LC50, the concentration sufficient to kill 50% of the tested population), only 2% of hemoglobin molecules were carbamylated, suggesting that this is probably not the mechanism of toxicity.

Extraterrestrial occurrence 

On 30 July 2015, scientists reported that upon the first touchdown of the Philae lander on comet 67/P surface, measurements by the COSAC and Ptolemy instruments revealed sixteen organic compounds, four of which were seen for the first time on a comet, including acetamide, acetone, methyl isocyanate and propionaldehyde.

In 2017, two teams of astronomers using the Atacama Large Millimeter Array (ALMA) interferometer made of 66 radio telescopes in the Atacama Desert (northern Chile) have discovered the presence of MIC around young Sun-like stars. 

MIC is considered  a prebiotic molecule as explained by the discoverers of the ALMA findings in IRAS 16293-2422, a multiple system of very young stars: "This family of organic molecules is involved in the synthesis of peptides and amino acids, which, in the form of proteins, are the biological basis for life as we know it".

References

External links 
 NIOSH Safety and Health Topic: Isocyanates, from the website of the National Institute for Occupational Safety and Health (NIOSH).
 U.S. National Library of Medicine: Hazardous Substances Databank – Methyl isocyanate

Isocyanates
Monomers
Bhopal disaster
Pulmonary agents
Lachrymatory agents
Prebiotic chemistry